Shakhtal Khan-e Seh (also Romanized as Shākhtal Khān-e Seh) is a village in Darkhoveyn Rural District, in the Central District of Shadegan County, Khuzestan Province, Iran. At the 2006 census, its population was 192, in 33 families.

References 

Populated places in Shadegan County